Borough 5 is a northern borough of Düsseldorf, the state capital of North Rhine-Westphalia, Germany. Düsseldorf's International Airport is located in the borough. It is the largest borough by land area, but also the least populated. The borough covers an area of 50.75 square kilometres and (as of December 2020) has about 34,500 inhabitants.

Stadtbezirk 5 borders with the Düsseldorf boroughs 1 and 6 to the South, and - via a shared border across the Rhine - borough 4 to the South-West. To the West - also across the Rhine - it borders with Rhein-Kreis Neuss. Further it shares borders with the city of Duisburg to the North, and Kreis Mettmann to the East.

Subdivisions 
Borough 5 is made up of six Stadtteile (city parts):

Places of interest

Arts, Culture and Entertainment 
 Kaiserswerth Imperial Palace, Kaiserswerth
 Messegelände incl. multifunctional Esprit Arena, Stockum

Landmarks 
 St. Suitbertus, Kaiserswerth
 Kalkum Palace, Kalkum

Parks and open spaces 
 Nordpark

Transportation 
The borough is served by numerous railway stations and highway. Düsseldorf Airport is located in Lohausen, part of Borough 5. Stations include Düsseldorf Airport, Düsseldorf-Angermund and both Düsseldorf Stadtbahn light rail- and Rheinbahn tram-stations. The borough can also be reached via Bundesautobahn 44, 52 and 59 as well as Bundesstraße 7 and 8.

Rhine bridges 
  Flughafenbrücke

See also 
 Boroughs of Düsseldorf
 Rhine-Ruhr

References

External links 
 Official webpage of the district 

!